Dalibor Ðurđić (born 7 June 1975) is a Serbian bobsledder. He competed in the four man event at the 2002 Winter Olympics, representing Yugoslavia.

References

1975 births
Living people
Yugoslav male bobsledders
Serbian male bobsledders
Olympic bobsledders of Yugoslavia
Bobsledders at the 2002 Winter Olympics
Sportspeople from Belgrade